Roger Dale Hatcher (born April 5, 1963) is a former American football punter for the Los Angeles Rams and the Miami Dolphins of the National Football League (NFL).  He played college football at Clemson University.

In 1985, Hatcher was named Pro Bowl and AP All Pro First-team.  His blocked punt decided the first overtime regular-season NFL game to be decided by a safety. On November 5, 1989, in Minneapolis, Minnesota, Hatcher helped end the game as he tried to punt, only to have it blocked by Minnesota Vikings linebacker Mike Merriweather to give the Vikings a 23–21 win over the Rams.  Teammate Jim Everett threw for the only three touchdowns of the game for the Rams as the Vikings' only other points were Rich Karlis' record-tying seven field goals.

After his professional football career ended, Hatcher took a job working at Freightliner Custom Chassis in Gaffney, South Carolina.

References

1963 births
Living people
American football punters
Clemson Tigers football players
Los Angeles Rams players
Miami Dolphins players
National Conference Pro Bowl players
People from Cheraw, South Carolina
Players of American football from South Carolina
National Football League replacement players